DAVIC, Digital Audio Video Council, was founded in 1994 with the aim of promoting the success of interactive digital audio-visual applications and services by promulgating specifications of open interfaces and protocols that maximise interoperability, not only across geographical boundaries but also across diverse applications, services and industries.  It was a non-profit international organization based in Switzerland.

DAVIC was closed, according to its statutes, after 5 years of activity.

At the most DAVIC had 222 companies from more than 25 countries as members, although over its life 295 organisations were members at some stage. It represented all sectors of the audio-visual industry: manufacturing (computer, consumer electronics and telecommunications equipment) and service (broadcasting, telecommunications and CATV), as well as a number of government agencies and research organisations. 

The four major sets of specifications culminated in 1999 with the 1.4 version. The 1.5 version of DAVIC was a set of additional tools and service definitions opening the road towards the setting of IP based audiovisual services such as the TV Anytime and TV Anywhere services. Version 1.3.1 was re-structured and was approved as an ISO/IEC standard and technical report (ISO/IEC 16500 and ISO/IEC TR 16501).

The management of DAVIC had proposed the continuation beyond the 5-year date with a program of work centred on two projects: TV Anytime and TV Anywhere. The membership did not support the continuation of DAVIC but the idea of TV-Anytime continued as a new organisation.

1.4.1 specifications
 
 Description of DAVIC Audio-Visual Functionalities 
 System Reference Models and Scenarios 
 Service Provider System Architecture and Interfaces 
 Delivery System Architecture And Interfaces 
 Service Consumer System Architecture 
 Management Architecture and Protocols 
 High and Mid Layer Protocols 
 Lower Layer Protocols and Physical Interfaces 
 Information Representation 
 Basic Security Tools 
 Usage Information Protocols 
 Systems Dynamics, Scenarios and Protocol Requirements 
 Conformance and Interoperability 
 Contours: Technology Domain

1.5 specifications
 Jitter concealment tools 
 Applicability of DAVIC 1.5 Intranet Architecture to TV Anywhere and TV Anytime Scenarios 
 DAVIC Cable Modem 
 DAVIC Intranet Technical Platform Specification 
 TV Anytime and TV Anywhere

See also
 ATSC
 DVB
 ISDB

External links
 DAVIC's home page - password protected -- link broken as of 23 May 2013, now redirects to a (building) Development Approvals site for Victoria, Australia.
 Web archive version of 2005 www.davic.org - password protected -- link broken as of 23 May 2013, now redirects to a (building) Development Approvals site for Victoria, Australia.
 Web archive version of 2005 www.davic.org, but cannot download the documents from here
 Copies of DAVIC previously published specifications now available for download
 Leonardo Chiariglione website - evangelist for DAVIC

Technology trade associations
Organizations established in 1994
Organizations disestablished in 1999
International trade associations